Władysław Szczepkowski (born July 9, 1966 at Olsztyn, Poland) is a Polish lawyer.

He studied at the Nicolaus Copernicus University in Toruń, Poland. Before working for PKP Cargo he was director of the law department of the Cetelem Bank in Poland. He is the current president, and former CEO of PKP Cargo.

References

1966 births
Living people
People from Olsztyn
Polish chief executives
Nicolaus Copernicus University in Toruń alumni
20th-century Polish lawyers